Johan Meens (born 7 July 1999) is a Belgian cyclist, who currently rides for UCI ProTeam .

References

External links

1999 births
Living people
Belgian male cyclists
21st-century Belgian people